García Díaz Arias (died 1562) was a Roman Catholic prelate who served as the first Bishop of Quito (1546–1562).

Biography
On 8 January 1546, García Díaz Arias was appointed during the papacy of Pope Paul III as Bishop of Quito. On 5 June 1547, he was consecrated bishop by Juan Solano, Bishop of Cuzco. He served as Bishop of Quito until his death in 1562.

While bishop, he was the principal co-consecrator of Martín de Calatayud, Bishop of Santa Marta (1547).

References

External links and additional sources
 (for Chronology of Bishops) 
 (for Chronology of Bishops) 

16th-century Roman Catholic bishops in Ecuador
Bishops appointed by Pope Paul III
1562 deaths
Roman Catholic bishops of Quito